Emily Cox and Henry Rathvon are a married American puzzle-writing team. They wrote the "Atlantic Puzzler", a monthly cryptic crossword in  The Atlantic magazine, from September 1977 to October 2009; it was published online-only beginning March 2006. They also create acrostics and cryptic crosswords for the New York Times, cryptics for Canada's National Post, puzzles for the US Airways in-flight magazine, and (with Henry Hook) Sunday crosswords for the Boston Globe.

Often published under the pseudonym Hex, Cox and Rathvon are considered pioneers of the American cryptic crossword and remain among the form's greatest exponents.

Career

In 2005, Rathvon's play Trapezium, a comedy in iambic pentameter, was produced by the Orlando-UCF Shakespeare Festival. The play was also performed at Playhouse on Park in West Hartford, CT in 2010.

Personal life

Cox's parents were the pianist Shirley Louise ( Peet) Cox and the Rev. Dr. Howard H. Cox. From a young age, Emily showed interest in playing trombone, painting suspension bridges, reading about science matters, and rock climbing.

Cox and Rathvon, who are married, at one point lived in Hershey, Pennsylvania.

References

Puzzle designers
The Atlantic (magazine) people
Living people
The Boston Globe people
The New York Times people
Crossword compilers
Year of birth missing (living people)